Charles Talbot Porter (January 18, 1826 – August 28, 1910) was an American lawyer, engineer, and inventor of mechanical devices, particularly the high-speed steam engine. He was recipient of the 1909 John Fritz Medal.

Born in Auburn, New York, Porter was the son of the John Porter, a lawyer and politician. He obtained his law degree from Hamilton College in 1845, started his career as lawyer, and grew out to be one of the foremost of modern American engineers of his days.

Selected publications 
 Charles Talbot Porter. Description of Richards' improved steam-engine indicator 
 Porter, Charles T. A treatise on the Richards steam-engine indicator, with directions for its use, New York, D. Van Nostrand, 1883.
 Charles Talbot Porter. Description of the Porter-Allen steam engine as made by the Southwark Foundry and Machine Co., Philadelphia. C.C. Chalfant, printer, 1885. 
 Porter, Charles T. Engineering Reminiscences contributed to "Power" and "American machinist". New York, J. Wiley, 1910.

Works about Charles Talbot Porter
 Mayr, Otto. "„Von Charles Talbot Porter zu Johann Friedrich Radinger: Die Anfänge der schnelllaufenden Dampfmaschine und der Maschinendynamik”." Technikgeschichte 40.1 (1973): 1-32.
 Mayr, Otto. "Yankee practice and engineering theory: Charles T. Porter and the dynamics of the high-speed steam engine." Technology and culture (1975): 570-602.

References

External links 
 Charles Talbot Porter at asme.org
 Charles Talbot Porter at gracesguide.co.uk

1826 births
1910 deaths
American mechanical engineers
Hamilton College (New York) alumni
People from Auburn, New York
John Fritz Medal recipients
Engineers from New York (state)
19th-century American businesspeople